Mukono–Kayunga–Njeru Road is a road in the Central Region of Uganda, connecting the city of Mukono to the town of Njeru at the Nalubaale Power Station.

Location
The road starts at Mukono, the headquarters of Mukono District.

Upgrading to bitumen
The road with a bitumen surface, in varying degrees of disrepair was earmarked for improvement to class II bitumen surface, with shoulders, drainage channels and culverts.

References

External links
 Uganda National Road Authority Homepage

Roads in Uganda
Buikwe District
Kayunga District
Mukono District